Tov may refer to:

Tales of Vesperia, a video game which is the tenth mothership title in the Tales series.
Tolman–Oppenheimer–Volkoff limit
The Hebrew word meaning "good"
Mazel tov, a Hebrew expression meaning congratulations
Töv, one of the 21 provinces of Mongolia